The 70th parallel south is a circle of latitude that is 70 degrees south of the Earth's equatorial plane in the Antarctic. The parallel passes through the Southern Ocean and Antarctica.

Around the world
Starting at the Prime Meridian and heading eastwards, the parallel 70° south passes through:

{| class="wikitable plainrowheaders"
! scope="col" width="125" | Co-ordinates
! scope="col" | Continent or ocean
! scope="col" | Notes
|-
| 
! scope="row" | Antarctica
| Queen Maud Land, claimed by 
|-
| style="background:#b0e0e6;" | 
! scope="row" style="background:#b0e0e6;" | Southern Ocean
| style="background:#b0e0e6;" | King Haakon VII Sea, south of the Atlantic Ocean
|-
| 
! scope="row" | Antarctica
| Queen Maud Land, claimed by 
|-
| style="background:#b0e0e6;" | 
! scope="row" style="background:#b0e0e6;" | Southern Ocean
| style="background:#b0e0e6;" | King Haakon VII Sea, south of the Indian Ocean
|-
| 
! scope="row" | Antarctica
| Queen Maud Land, claimed by 
|-
| style="background:#b0e0e6;" | 
! scope="row" style="background:#b0e0e6;" | Southern Ocean
| style="background:#b0e0e6;" | King Haakon VII Sea, south of the Indian Ocean
|-
| 
! scope="row" rowspan="5"| Antarctica
| Queen Maud Land, claimed by 
|-
| 
| Western Australian Antarctic Territory, claimed by 
|-
| 
| Adélie Land, claimed by 
|-
| 
| George V Land, claimed by 
|-
| 
| Ross Dependency, claimed by 
|-
| style="background:#b0e0e6;" | 
! scope="row" style="background:#b0e0e6;" | Southern Ocean
| style="background:#b0e0e6;" |  South of the Pacific Ocean
|-
| 
! scope="row" | Antarctica
|-
| style="background:#b0e0e6;" | 
! scope="row" style="background:#b0e0e6;" | Southern Ocean
| style="background:#b0e0e6;" | Weddell Sea, south of the Atlantic Ocean
|-
| 
! scope="row" | Antarctica
| Queen Maud Land, claimed by 
|}

See also
69th parallel south
71st parallel south
List of Antarctic and sub-Antarctic islands

s70
Geography of Antarctica